Jacki Schechner is a former CNN and Current TV news correspondent and on-air personality for The Stephanie Miller Show. As of 2018, she was the Editor-in-Chief of The Committee to Investigate Russia, a nonprofit organization whose website aggregates information related to alleged links between Trump associates and Russian officials.

She became a target of Bill O'Reilly during his "Talking Points" segment when he kept referring to her as "the former CNN reporter."

Education
Schechner has a Master of Arts in Broadcast Journalism from the University of Miami and Bachelor of Arts in Diplomatic History from the University of Pennsylvania.

References

Year of birth missing (living people)
Living people
American television journalists
American women television journalists
University of Miami School of Architecture alumni
University of Pennsylvania alumni
21st-century American women